Rudolf-Aleksander Kuris (26 November 1890 Vao Parish (now Väike-Maarja Parish), Kreis Wierland – 28 January 1950 Luton, England) was an Estonian politician. He was a member of IV Riigikogu.

References

1890 births
1950 deaths
People from Väike-Maarja Parish
People from Kreis Wierland
Settlers' Party politicians
Members of the Riigikogu, 1929–1932
Members of the Riigikogu, 1932–1934
Estonian World War II refugees
Estonian emigrants to the United Kingdom